The Joel family of England was headed by three brothers, Jack, Woolf and Solomon, who made a fortune in diamond and gold mining in South Africa. Their father was Joel Joel (1836–1893) and their mother Catherine "Kate" Joel née Isaacs (1840–1917), a sister of Barnett Isaacs, later known as Barney Barnato.

As well as being prominent Randlords, several of the Joel family became widely known in thoroughbred horse racing as owner/breeders of numerous winners of British Classic Races.

The Joel brothers
 Jack Barnato Joel (1862–1940), mining magnate, Chairman of Johannesburg Consolidated Investment Company Ltd (from 1931), Thoroughbred racehorse owner/breeder married to Olive Coulson Sopwith (d. 1937), daughter of Thomas Sopwith.
 Woolf Barnato Joel (1863–1898), South African mining magnate
 Solomon Barnato Joel (1865–1931), mining, brewing and railway magnate

Other Joels
Other prominent members of the Joel family include:
 Stanhope Henry Joel (1903–1973), businessman, Thoroughbred racehorse owner/breeder
 Dudley Joel (1904–1941), businessman, politician, World War II naval officer

Other relations
 Barney Barnato
 Joel Woolf Barnato, son of Barney Barnato
Diana Barnato Walker

Family tree
Joel Joel (1836/1837 - 7 Apr 1893), son of Isaac Joel (c1800-1847) and Rebecca Solomon (c1800-1842). Joel Joel married Catherine Isaacs (1840, Spitalfields - 8 Nov 1917). She was the daughter of Isaac Isaacs and Leah Harris
 Jack Barnato Joel (29 Sep 1862 - 13 Nov 1940) x Edith Richards (3 children) xx Olive Coulson Sopwith (1876-1937)
 Harry "Jim" Joel (1894 – 23 March 1992), businessman, philanthropist, Thoroughbred racehorse owner/breeder
 May  b.1892  d.10 Feb 1971
 Kathleen
 Woolf Joel (22 Nov 1863-14 March 1898) (shot dead in Johannesburg office by blackmailer Baron Kurt von Veltheim whose real name was Karl Frederic Moritz Kurtze, and was born at Allhausen, Brunswick, on 4 December 1857)
 Geoffrey (10 March 1896 London - 22 March 1957 Johannesburg) x Edith - maiden name unknown.  
 Solomon Barnato Joel (23 May 1865 - 22 May 1931) married Ellen "Nellie" Ridley (1867-14 August 1919) (5 children) xx Phoebe Carlow
 Doris Irene Kathleen b. 1898 d. 14 August 1919 x Arthur Walter
 Woolf 26 April 1892 d.13 November 1923, named after Uncle Woolf Joel
 Stanhope Henry b.8 February 1903 at 2 Gt. Stanhope St, Mayfair x Gladys MacFadden
 Solna, married Harry Thomson Jones
 Dana
 Thalia
 Dudley Jack Barnato (26 April 1904 - 26 May 1941) (drowned at sea) - Conservative Party Member of Parliament x Esme Ritchie
 Eileen Daphne Solvia (20 March 1907 - 30 Jan 1974) x John Rogerson

See also
 Joel Stakes
 Sol Joel Park
 Diana Barnato Walker

References

External links
 Joel Family Tree

 
British Jewish families
English Jews
Business families
British racehorse owners and breeders
Jewish-South African families
South African Jews
British mining businesspeople
South African mining businesspeople